The Komati Formation, also named as Komatii Formation, is a 3.475 billion year old Paleoarchean rock formation, named after the nearby Komati River in South Africa. It is the type locality for komatiite, a high temperature, magnesium-rich volcanic rock occurring in the Barberton Greenstone Belt, Mpumalanga.

Description 
The formation, belonging to the Tjakastad Subgroup of the Onverwacht Group, overlies the Theespruit Formation and is overlain by the Hooggenoeg Formation of the Geluk Subgroup. Komatiites and tholeiites from the Komati Formation were analyzed for sulfur and provided δ34S values between −0.7 and 5.2 ‰.

The Komatii Formation comprises metamorphosed komatiites and basaltic komatiites, with minor mafic lavas and small intrusions. The lower part of the Komatii Formation is dominantly ultramafic, while the upper part is dominantly mafic.

References

Bibliography 

 
 

 

Geologic formations of South Africa
Archean Africa
Paleoarchean volcanism
Volcanism of South Africa
Mining in South Africa
Formations